The 2019 Barcelona FIA Formula 2 round was a pair of motor races for Formula 2 cars that took place on 11 and 12 May 2019 at the Circuit de Barcelona-Catalunya in Catalonia, Spain as part of the FIA Formula 2 Championship. It was the third round of the 2019 FIA Formula 2 Championship and ran in support of the 2019 Spanish Grand Prix.

Classification

Qualifying

Notes
 – Jack Aitken and Dorian Boccolacci were given three-place grid penalties for the use of an undeclared and unmarked rear plank.
 – Tatiana Calderón was given a three-place grid penalty for causing a collision at the previous round in Baku.

Feature race

Sprint race

Notes
 – Mick Schumacher originally finished 8th but was given a five-second time penalty for failing to rejoin the track safely.
 – Sérgio Sette Câmara originally finished 15th but was given a five-second time penalty for failing to rejoin the track safely.

Championship standings after the round

Drivers' Championship standings

Teams' Championship standings

See also
2019 Barcelona FIA Formula 3 round

References

External links 
 

Barcelona
Barcelona
Auto races in Spain
Barcelona FIA Formula 2 round